Francine Estelle Zouga Edoa (born 9 November 1987) is a Cameroonian footballer who plays as a midfielder for FF Chenois in the Swiss Nationalliga B. She joined the Swiss club from French Division 1 Féminine side Montpellier HSC in February 2015.  At the 2012 Summer Olympics, she represented Cameroon.

References

External links
 
 
 

1987 births
Living people
Footballers from Yaoundé
Cameroonian women's footballers
Expatriate women's footballers in France
Montpellier HSC (women) players
Cameroonian expatriate women's footballers
Cameroonian expatriate sportspeople in France
Cameroonian expatriate sportspeople in Switzerland
Olympic footballers of Cameroon
Footballers at the 2012 Summer Olympics
2015 FIFA Women's World Cup players
Cameroon women's international footballers
Division 1 Féminine players
Women's association football midfielders
CSHVSM-Kairat players
Cameroonian expatriate sportspeople in Kazakhstan
Expatriate women's footballers in Kazakhstan
21st-century Cameroonian women
20th-century Cameroonian women